Kafka Award may refer to:

 Janet Heidiger Kafka Prize
 Franz Kafka Prize